The R828 road is a regional road in Dún Laoghaire–Rathdown, Ireland.

The official definition of the R828 from the Roads Act 1993 (Classification of Regional Roads) Order 2012 states:

R828: Stradbrook Road - Killiney, County Dublin

Between its junction with R827 at Deansgrange Road and its junction with R118 at Church Road Killiney via Stradbrook Road, Abbey Road and Rochestown Avenue all in the county of Dún Laoghaire–Rathdown.

See also
Roads in Ireland
Regional road

References

Regional roads in the Republic of Ireland
Roads in County Dublin